The Schleicher K 8 (also known as Ka-8) is a single-seat glider designed by Rudolf Kaiser and built by the Alexander Schleicher company of Germany.

Design and development

The K 8 was derived from the earlier Ka 6 design as a simple single-place sailplane with air brakes using construction techniques similar to the Schleicher K 7, simplified for amateur construction from kits. Emphasis was on rugged construction, good climbing ability in thermals and good handling characteristics.

The prototype K 8 made its first flight in November 1957 and over 1,100 were built in three main versions. The original K 8 had a very small canopy. Side windows for improved visibility were introduced in the next version, and the K 8B, by far the most numerous variant, has a larger one-piece blown Plexiglas canopy. The K 8C features a longer nose, larger main wheel located ahead of the center of gravity and deletion of the larger wooden nose skid resulting in a roomier cockpit.

The cantilever high wings are single-spar structures of pine and plywood, with a plywood leading edge torsion box and fabric covering aft of the spar; the forward sweep is 1° 18' and dihedral is 3°. There are Schempp-Hirth air brakes in the upper and lower surfaces and the wooden ailerons are plywood covered. The cantilever tail unit is of similar construction to the wings, with ply-covered fixed surfaces and fabric-covered rudder and elevators, and a trim tab in the elevator is an optional fitting. The fuselage is a welded steel-tube structure, with fabric covering over spruce longerons and a glass fibre nose cone.

There is a non-retractable and unsprung monowheel, with optional brake, and a nose skid mounted on rubber blocks in front of it, plus a steel skid at the tail.

Operational history

Karl Striedieck of the United States made a 767 km / 476.6 mile ridge flight in a K 8B to establish a world out-and-return record in 1968.

Motor glider variants
A motor glider conversion of the K 8B was developed by LVD (the Flying Training School of the Detmold Aero Club) similar to their conversion of a Scheibe Bergfalke IV known as the BF IV-BIMO, in which a Lloyd LS-400 piston engine mounted in the fuselage drives a pair of small two-blade pusher propellers rotating within cutouts in each wing near the trailing edge.

Another motorglider conversion was used by "Vestjysk Svæveflyveklub" in Denmark: it had a small Wankel rotary engine mounted in a nacelle on an aluminium stick above the main spar. The engine was started with a recoil starter like a lawn mower. The high RPM of the device made it extremely unpopular: the propeller tips created a permanent sonic boom, that made the plane extremely noisy. The harassed citizens of Esbjerg nicknamed the plane 'the flying circular saw' and the engine was removed.

Specifications (K 8B)

See also

Notes

References

External links

Schleicher Web Site
Sailplane directory Dead Link
 Another site with Production History.

1950s German sailplanes
Schleicher aircraft
High-wing aircraft
Aircraft first flown in 1957